Battle of Narbonne may refer to:
Battle of Narbonne (436), between Rome and the Visigoths.
Siege of Narbonne (737), between the forces of the Umayyad governor of Narbonne, and a Frankish army led by Charles Martel.
Siege of Narbonne (752–59), between the forces of the Umayyad governor of Narbonne, and a Frankish army led by Pepin the Short.
Battle of Narbonne (763), between Francia and Aquitaine.